Alexandra "Alex" Tilley (born 5 October 1993)  is a Scottish alpine ski racer. She is from Torphins, Aberdeenshire, Scotland.

She competed at the 2015 World Championships in Beaver Creek, US, in the giant slalom. She scored her first points in the Alpine Skiing World Cup when she finished 19th in a giant slalom in Lienz in December 2015. At the 2017 World Championships in St. Moritz, Switzerland, she finished 30th in the giant slalom and 25th in the slalom.

She competed in the 2018 and 2022 Winter Olympics in the slalom and giant slalom skiing events. She broke her ankle while training in November 2021.

World Cup results

Results per discipline

World Championship results

Olympic results

Other results

European Cup results

Season standings

Results per discipline

Standings through 29 January 2021

References

External links

1993 births
Living people
Scottish female alpine skiers
Olympic alpine skiers of Great Britain
Alpine skiers at the 2018 Winter Olympics
Alpine skiers at the 2022 Winter Olympics
Sportspeople from Aberdeenshire